Satya Harishchandra is a 1965 Indian Telugu-language Hindu mythological film, based on the life of Harishchandra, produced and directed by K. V. Reddy under the Vijaya Productions banner. It stars N. T. Rama Rao and S. Varalakshmi, with music composed by Pendyala Nageswara Rao.

The film released on 22 April 1965 and was not successful at the box-office. K. V. Reddy produced the film simultaneously in Kannada with the same title, starring Dr Rajkumar.

Plot 
Harishchandra (N. T. Rama Rao) is the ruler of Ayodhya belonging to Suryavamsam. He is one among the six kings who ruled the earth like heaven and performed a hundred Rajasuya Yagas, whose path of life is always the truth.

Once in Indra's (Mikkilineni) court, Maharshi Viswamitra (Mukkamala) had a confrontation with Maharshi Vasishta (V. Nagayya) that he will divert Harishchandra's path of truth. In the beginning, Viswamitra asks a huge amount, and without any hesitation, Harishchandra agrees. Viswamitra asks to keep it with him as his property. Then he creates wild animals which create trouble when Harishchandra moves for the protection of people in the forest. There he creates two beautiful women called Matanga Kanyalu (Rajasri and Meena Kumari), tries to lure Harishchandra, and also threatens either to marry the girls or leave the kingdom. Harishchandra gives away his kingdom when Viswamitra asks to repay the amount.

Here Harishchandra asks for some time, Viswamitra gives a month and accompanies his assistant Nakshatraka (Ramana Reddy). On the way, Viswamitra keeps many tests on Harishchandra but he stands on his true path. After reaching Kasi, he observes that people are sold in the market. Due to the shortage of time, on his wife Chandramathi's (S. Varalakshmi) advice, he sells her along with his son Lohitha. Lord Kaasi Viswanath (Prabhakar Reddy) buys them in the form of Kalakousika (Relangi). After that, Nakshatraka asks him to pay his travel expenses for which he sells himself to Veerabahu (Rajanala), king of the graveyard.

Now Harishchandra starts working as a watchman at the burial ground and Chandramathi and Lohitha as slaves in Kalakousika's house. One day, unfortunately, Lohitha dies due to a snakebite. While Chandramathi is performing his funeral, Harischandra stops and asks her to pay the fee without knowing her identity. But she doesn't have anything to pay; then he indicates her golden wedding chain when she recognizes him as her husband because her wedding chain is invisible to others. In such pathetic situations also Harishchandra did not yield. Chandramathi rushes to get the money from her owner. At the same time, Viswamitra creates an illusion that Chadramathi has kidnapped and killed Kaasiraju's son. The King gives the death sentence to her and sends her to Harishchandra to execute it. Even then he does not leave his true path and executes the punishment.

Suddenly, Viswamitra, Vasishta and Lord Siva appear. Finally, Viswamitra accepts his defeat before Harishchandra and by the blessings of Lord Siva, he gets back his kingdom.

Cast 
N. T. Rama Rao as Harishchandra
S. Varalakshmi as Chandramathi
V. Nagayya as Maharshi Vasishta
Mukkamala as Brahmarshi Viswamitra
Rajanala as Veerabahudu
Relangi as Kalakousikudu
Ramana Reddy as Nakshatrakudu
Mikkilineni as Indra
Prabhakar Reddy as Lord Siva
Chadalavada as Auctioneer
Raja Babu as Kalakousikudu's disciple
Balakrishna as Kalakousikudu's disciple
 Nalla Ramamurthy as Kalakousikudu's disciple
 Ramakoti as Kalakousikudu's disciple
 A. V. Subbarao Jr. as Satyakeerthi
Girija as Kalahakanthi
L. Vijayalakshmi as Menaka
Vanisri as Matangi
Rajasree as Matanga Kanya
Meena Kumari as Matanga Kanya
Mohana as Queen of Kasi
Sabita Devi as Goddess Parvathi
 Master Babu as Lohitasyudu

Production 
After the success of Sri Krishnarjuna Yuddhamu (1963) based on popular mythological play Gayopakhyanam, K. V. Reddy planned a film based on another mythological play Satya Harishchandra for Vijaya Productions. The songs and poems written by Balijepalli Lakshmikantha Kavi for his magnum opus play Satya Harischandriyamu in 1924 were already popular with the audience. However, due to copyright issues, K. V. Reddy could not use those poems. Pingali wrote new poems and songs for the film. K. V. Reddy also produced the film for Vijaya Productions. The film titled Satya Harishchandra starred N. T. Rama Rao in the title role and S. Varalakshmi as Chandramathi. The film released on 22 April 1965 and was a failure at the box-office. Audience accustomed to the old poems of Lakshmikantha Kavi were disappointed with the new ones and this was attributed as one of the reasons for the failure of the film.

Music 

Music was composed by Pendyala Nageswara Rao. Lyrics were written by Pingali Nagendra Rao. Music released by EMI Columbia Audio Company.

References

Bibliography

External links 

1965 films
1960s Telugu-language films
Films about Raja Harishchandra
Films directed by K. V. Reddy
Films scored by Pendyala Nageswara Rao